Miss Europe 1982 was the 42nd edition of the Miss Europe pageant and the 31st edition under the Mondial Events Organization. It was held in Istanbul, Turkey on June 11, 1982. Nazlı Deniz Kuruoğlu of Turkey, was crowned Miss Europe 1982 by out going titleholder Anne Mette Larsen of Denmark.

Results

Placements

Special awards

Contestants 

 - Karin Stocklitsch
 - Marie-Pierre Lemaître
 - Tina Maria Nielsen
 - Jane Karen Davidson
 - Tarja Hakakoski
 - Sabrina Belleval
 - Bettina Seylert
 - Michelle Lara
 - Nantina Synnefia (Konstantina Synnefia)
 - Brigitte Dierickx
 - Hlín Sveinsdóttir
 - Geraldine Mary McGrory
 - Ivana Gianferdi
 - Brigitte Hlywiak
 - Adelina Camilleri
 - Anne Nybo
 - Ana Maria Valdiz Wilson
 - Lena Masterton
 - Cristina Perez Cottrell
 - Annelie Margareta Sjöberg
 - Jeannette Linkenheil
 - Nazlı Deniz Kuruoğlu
 - Caroline Jane Williams

Notes

Returns

Withdrawals

"Comité Officiel et International Miss Europe" Competition

From 1951 to 2002 there was a rival Miss Europe competition organized by the "Comité Officiel et International Miss Europe". This was founded in 1950 by Jean Raibaut in Paris, the headquarters later moved to Marseille. The winners wore different titles like Miss Europe, Miss Europa or Miss Europe International.

This year's competition took place in Athens, Greece. There were at least 2 delegates from 2 countries. Not much information was documented about this year's competition other than 2 contestants attending the pageant, where the pageant was held and time span of when it could have been held.

Contestants

 - Mirja Riitta Helenius
 - Margot Keune

References

External links 
 

Miss Europe
1982 beauty pageants
1982 in Turkey
1982 in Greece